Jack Carrington (1909-1984), was a male English international table tennis player.

Table tennis career
He won a silver medal at the 1947 World Table Tennis Championships in the men's doubles with Johnny Leach. Four years later he won a bronze medal at the 1951 World Table Tennis Championships in the men's doubles with Leach.

He also won an English Open title.

Personal life
He married fellow international Elsie Weaver.

After retiring from playing he worked as head coach of the English Table Tennis Association ETTA and Director of Coaching. He organized national and international tournament events and ensured especially in the schools for the promotion of table tennis. In 1959 he coached the German national team.

See also
 List of table tennis players
 List of World Table Tennis Championships medalists

References

English male table tennis players
1909 births
1984 deaths
World Table Tennis Championships medalists